Lanre da Silva (born 1978) is a Nigerian fashon designer based in  Lagos. Launched in 2005, her eponymous label includes couture, ready-to-wear, jewelry and hairpieces. Da Silva's collections often incorporate metallic fabrics, lace and African patterns, while referencing the 1940s or 1800s. The Africa Fashion Guide recognizes her as having "... created a name for  herself in high fashion in Nigeria."

Early life and education
Upon high school graduation in Nigeria, da Silva moved to the United Kingdom to continue her studies. For her undergraduate degree, she majored in business administration at Coventry University. She obtained a master's degree in Finance from the University of Leicester. Da Silva is married with children and has two siblings. Their father is Sir Leo Babarinde Da Silva, a former Secretary to the Lagos State Government.

Career
In 2011, da Silva presented her collection at New York Fashion Week. Seen as an African luxury brand, her clothing line has been sold at Dolce & Gabbana's "Concept Spiga 2" store in Milan. In 2012, she was one of two designers asked to join the United Nations "Fashion Development Project" which helps supports her continent's luxury industry. That same year her label was featured in the magazine L'Uomo Vogue in an issue called  «Re-branding Africa».

In 2012, Italian Vogue wrote a piece on da Silva, mentioning that she has a "... great following in Africa, where her designs are widely recognized thanks to the media and celebrities that support her." In 2014, she was mentioned once more in Vogue Italia, where the designer spoke about meeting the magazine's editor Franca Sozzani, who got her collection noticed and stocked at online fashion retailer yoox.com   Da Silva's designs have also been featured in Vogue Black and Arise Magazine.

Da Silva's clothes have been described as groundbreaking in their use of traditional African prints. She is recognized for re-interpreting and modernizing traditional motifs, making them an important part of her designs. In 2017, da Silva  was asked to create outfits for the 2017 look book of Vlisco, an African fabrics and textiles manufacturer.

In 2014, her "Rock Delight" collection was presented at the "Vogue Talents" fashion show in Milan, Italy. The designer was inspired by the colours and lines of Olumo Rock, a popular tourist destination located in Nigeria. Her clothes have also been seen at shows such as the 2008 Thisday Africa Rising Festival in London, the 2009 Arise Africa Fashion Festival in South Africa, the 2009 New York Couture Fashion Week and the 2011 Arise Magazine Fashion Week in Lagos. In 2018, da Silva returned to the Arise Africa Fashion Festival where her collection was described as being elegant and accented by metallic gold colours   British supermodel Naomi Campbell opened the show wearing one of da Silva's outfits.

Creating what she calls wearable art, da Silva collaborated with artist Ayoola Gbolahan for her 2017 collection. Rich in details, the clothes are described as embodying an artistic imagery : "Art and fashion are successfully united in this collection with bold hand-painted images on solid colors." That same year she was nominated for an Eloy Award, a Nigerian event celebrating female achievement. In 2016, the designer graced the cover of the Nigerian publication Complete Fashion Magazine.

When starting out as a designer, da Silva found the Nigerian infrastructure to be a challenge. It was difficult for her to find experienced tailors and quality zippers. However, the industry has grown since then, with investments coming in from government and corporations. Lagos is now emerging as the fashion epicentre of the African continent.

References

Nigerian women fashion designers
Luxury brands
Clothing brands of Nigeria
Alumni of Coventry University
Alumni of the University of Leicester
1978 births
Living people